False Faces or False Face may refer to:
 False Face Society, a medicinal society among the Iroquois
 False Faces (1943 film), an American mystery film
 The False Faces, a 1919 American silent drama film 
 Let 'Em Have It, a 1935 American gangster film, also known as False Faces
 False Face (film), a 1977 horror film also known as Scalpel
 False Face, a DC Comics supervillain